Spiritual Apocalypse is the fifth full-length album by Floridian death metal band Monstrosity. Critics were overwhelmingly positive. The album cover art is by David Ho.

Track listing
All lyrics by Lee Harrison.

Personnel
Monstrosity
Mike Hrubovcak – vocals
Mark English – guitars
Mike Poggione – bass
Lee Harrison – drums
Additional musicians
Kelly Shaefer of Atheist – guest vocals
Matt LaPorte – guitars
Jason Suecof – guitars ending solo on "The Bloodline Horror"
James Malone – guitars ending solo on "The Bloodline Horror"
John Zahner – keyboards

References

Monstrosity (band) albums
2007 albums